Stiege is a village and a former municipality in the district of Harz, in Saxony-Anhalt, Germany. Since 1 January 2010, it is part of the town Oberharz am Brocken. Stiege has 1083 inhabitants (1-1-2010).

Transport
The village has a railway station on the Selke Valley Railway, part of the Harz Narrow Gauge Railways (HSB).

Former municipalities in Saxony-Anhalt
Oberharz am Brocken
Villages in the Harz
Duchy of Brunswick